Scoparia nomeutis is a moth in the family Crambidae. It was named by Edward Meyrick in 1884. Meyrick gave a description of this species in 1885. It is endemic to New Zealand.

The wingspan is 17–21 mm. The forewings are greyish-ochreous or fuscous, irrorated with white and with a few black scales. There is a suffused blackish spot in the middle of base and one on the inner margin near the base. The first line is whitish and blackish-margined posteriorly. The second line is also whitish, but blackish-margined anteriorly. The hindwings are fuscous-grey with a darker hindmargin. Adults have been recorded on wing in December.

References

Moths described in 1884
Moths of New Zealand
Scorparia
Endemic fauna of New Zealand
Taxa named by Edward Meyrick
Endemic moths of New Zealand